Joseph Ybarra (born ~1954) is an American producer and designer of video games. He left Apple Computer in 1982 to work at the new Electronic Arts that was founded by his fellow ex-employee Trip Hawkins. He was the original producer of the first Madden NFL.

Professional biography
Joe Ybarra worked at Apple Computer before leaving in 1982 to work at Electronic Arts, a startup company founded by his fellow ex-Apple employee, Trip Hawkins. There he became one of the original game producers and game designers at Electronic Arts in 1982 (along with Stewart Bonn, Dave Evans (Apple), Susan Lee-Merrow and Pat Marriott), where the concept of a game producer was created by Trip Hawkins.  During this time he produced several highly acclaimed computer games, including M.U.L.E. by Dani Bunten and Ozark Softscape, Seven Cities of Gold (also by Bunten), Starflight and Dr. J. and Larry Bird Go One on One by Eric Hammond.  Ybarra was also the original producer on the first version of Madden NFL.

He later became president of game publisher Infocom and produced MMORPGs for Sierra Online and Monolith Productions.

He had been working with Cheyenne Mountain Entertainment and its subsidiary FireSky on the Stargate Worlds MMO as Senior Vice President of Strategic Operations. However, Cheyenne Mountain Entertainment filed for bankruptcy on February 12, 2010 and no longer sells or operates Stargate: Resistance.

On March 11, 2013 Joe Ybarra announced a Kickstarter project for a simulation game called Shackleton Crater, billed as "the lunar colonization strategy game based on today's science and tomorrow's dream." However, it was closed down before achieving its funding goals.

Video games produced or designed by Joe Ybarra
Alien Legacy
Earth Orbit Stations
M.U.L.E.
John Madden Football
Dr. J. and Larry Bird Go One on One
Shadowbane
Spellcraft: Aspects of Valor
Starflight
Stargate Worlds
The Bard's Tale
The Matrix Online
Seven Cities of Gold
The Shadow of Yserbius

References

External links

Electronic Arts employees
Infocom
Living people
Madden NFL
Video game producers
Video game designers
Year of birth missing (living people)